Ihsanullah Ihsan (born 21 March 1992) is an Afghan cricketer. He made his List A debut for Boost Region in the 2017 Ghazi Amanullah Khan Regional One Day Tournament on 16 August 2017. He made his first-class debut for Mis Ainak Region in the 2017–18 Ahmad Shah Abdali 4-day Tournament on 25 November 2017.

References

External links
 

1992 births
Living people
Afghan cricketers
Boost Defenders cricketers
Mis Ainak Knights cricketers
Place of birth missing (living people)